The Roman Catholic Diocese of Kenge is a suffragan Latin diocese in the Ecclesiastical province of the Metropolitan Archdiocese of Kinshasa.
 
Its cathedral episcopal see is located in the city of Kenge, Bas-Congo, in the Democratic Republic of the Congo's Kongo Central province.

History 
 Established pn 5 July 1957 as Apostolic Prefecture of Kenge (exempt missionary jurisdiction), on territory split off from the Apostolic Vicariate of Kikwit and the Apostolic Vicariate of Kisantu
 Promoted on 6 July 1963 as Diocese of Kenge

Bishops

Ordinaries
(all Roman Rite; to March 31, 2018 all but one were Latin members of the Missionaries of the Divine Word, S.V.D.)

Apostolic Prefect of Kenge  
 Fr. Jean Van der Heyden, S.V.D. (1957 – 1963)

Suffragan Bishops of Kenge 
 François Hoenen, S.V.D. (6 July 1963 - 25 April 1974) 
 Dieudonné M'Sanda Tsinda-Hata (25 April 1974 - 1 June 1999) 
 Gaspard Mudiso Mundla, S.V.D. (1 June 1999 - 31 March 2018)), succeeding as former Coadjutor Bishop of Kenge (1997.12.13 – 1999.06.01)
 Jean-Pierre Kwambamba Masi (31 March 2018 - ...), succeeding as former Auxiliary Bishop of Kinshasa (2015.03.31 - 2018.03.31)

Coadjutor bishop
Gaspard Mudiso Mundla, S.V.D. (1997–1999)

Other priest of this diocese who became bishop
Bernard Marie Fansaka Biniama, appointed Bishop of Popokabaka in 2020

See also 
 Roman Catholicism in the Democratic Republic of the Congo

Source and External links 
 GCatholic.org, with incumbent biography links
 Catholic Hierarchy

Roman Catholic dioceses in the Democratic Republic of the Congo
Christian organizations established in 1957
Roman Catholic dioceses and prelatures established in the 20th century
Roman Catholic Ecclesiastical Province of Kinshasa